Louis Wescott Myers (September 6, 1872 – February 15, 1960) was the 20th Chief Justice of California.

Education and judicial career
Myers was born in Lake Mills, Wisconsin, to Jesse Hall Myers and Elizabeth Louise Wescott. Myers was educated in the public schools, and earned a bachelor's and a law degree at the University of Wisconsin-Madison, where he was Phi Beta Kappa. He practiced law first in Madison, Wisconsin, with the firm of Spooner, Sanborn & Kerr, and afterwards for several years in Chicago, Illinois with Jesse A. and Henry R. Baldwin. In 1898, he moved to Los Angeles, California and maintained a law firm. In 1913, he was appointed to a vacancy on the Los Angeles County Superior Court. He was elected in 1914 and re-elected in 1920.

On January 15, 1923, Governor William Stephens appointed Myers as Associate Justice of the Supreme Court of California to fill a vacancy when Curtis D. Wilbur was named chief justice. In April 1924, Governor Friend Richardson named Myers as Chief Justice to again replace Wilbur, who became the Secretary of the Navy. In October 1924, Myers ran unopposed and was elected for the remainder of Curtis' term, until January 1927. Myers served in that post until resigning as of January 1, 1926.

O'Melveny & Myers
Following his tenure as Chief Justice, Myers joined a Los Angeles law firm run by Henry W. O'Melveny. Myers's name was added to the firm, which by 1939 became known as O'Melveny & Myers. He specialized in appellate practice. In 1938, Myers argued before the U.S. Supreme Court on behalf of Mackay Radio the case of NLRB v. Mackay Radio & Telegraph Co., 304 U.S. 333 (1938).

Honors and awards
In 1925, Myers received an honorary degree of LL.D. from the University of Southern California. In 1926, he was awarded another honorary degree by the University of California.

Personal life
On November 27, 1901, he married Blanche Brown (July 26, 1874 – May 1, 1943) of Michigan; they had at least two children: Elizabeth Myers and test pilot John Wescott Myers. Louis was an avid fisherman, and in 1951 published a short book, An Incompleat Angler.

References

External links
 Louis W. Myers. In memoriam, 55 Cal. Rpts. 2d 909 (1960). California Supreme Court Historical Society.
 Opinions authored by Louis W. Myers. Courtlistener.com.
 Past & Present Justices. California State Courts. Retrieved July 19, 2017.

See also
 List of justices of the Supreme Court of California

1872 births
1960 deaths
People from Lake Mills, Wisconsin
University of Wisconsin–Madison alumni
University of Wisconsin Law School alumni
California state court judges
Justices of the Supreme Court of California
Chief Justices of California
20th-century American judges
Superior court judges in the United States
20th-century American lawyers
Lawyers from Los Angeles
American law firm executives
People associated with O'Melveny & Myers